Otis Tufts (February 14, 1804 - November 5, 1869) was a machinist and inventor who built printing machines, steam engines, firefighting equipment and invented the steam pile driver.

Biography
Otis Tufts was born in Cambridge, Massachusetts, in 1804 to Stephen Tufts and Lucy Frost Tufts. He had a twin brother, Joseph Tufts who died on July 24, 1807. On April 1, 1824, he married Sarah Caroline Oliver (1803-1868), in Malden, Massachusetts. Sarah was the daughter of William Oliver and Sarah Caroline Cheever. Together they had four children: Sarah, Eliza, Caroline and Otis.

In 1837, he built a steam-operated printing press. In addition, he built the first double-hulled iron steamship and the first vessel constructed of all iron in the United States based on the designs of John Ericsson. Tufts also invented the steam pile driver. He died in Massachusetts in 1869, at the age of 65.

References

1804 births
1869 deaths
People from Cambridge, Massachusetts
19th-century American inventors